Subseven (styled as subseven) is a Christian rock band formed in 1999 in Weatherford, Oklahoma. They played for four years as an independent in the Midwest, where they released one album and one EP and gained a large local fan base. In 2003, they signed a record deal with Flicker Records and soon after released Subseven: the EP. One year later they released their final album, Free to Conquer. 

The band's members included Wesley Fite, Clint McManaman, Reed Corbin, Caleb Wilkerson and Jake Sullivan before their breakup in December 2005. Ever since their breakup in 2005, the band members engaged in other musical activities, including bands and solo projects. In November 2007, their bass guitarist, Reed Corbin, died from a heart attack at the age of 33. 

In 2015, the band announced that they would be reuniting.

Members

1999-2003
Wesley Fite - vocals, guitar
Reed Corbin - bass
Clint McManaman - drums
Smokey Emerson - guitar

2003-2005
Wesley Fite - vocals, guitar
Reed Corbin - Bass
Clint McManaman - drums
Caleb Wilkerson - guitar
Jake Sullivan - guitar

2005
Wesley Fite - vocals, guitar
Clint McManaman - drums
Evan Crowley - guitar
Shaun Brown - bass

Band name
The name "Subseven" is short for "submitted to God." "Sub" means "submitted," and "seven" means God's number.

Discography

Music videos
 "Emotion" - Filmed in January 2004
 "Free to Conquer" - Filmed summer of 2005
 "Hold On" - Filmed December 2005

After the video shoot of "Hold On" at the Green Door, the band announced that they would be breaking up, and played a farewell show to the audience that showed up to be in the video.

References

External links
Flicker Records
[ subseven] at Allmusic
subseven at PureVolume
Facebook

1999 establishments in Oklahoma
American post-hardcore musical groups
Christian rock groups from Oklahoma
Flicker Records artists
Musical groups established in 1999